Games played (most often abbreviated as G or GP) is a statistic used in team sports to indicate the total number of games in which a player has participated (in any capacity); the statistic is generally applied irrespective of whatever portion of the game is contested. In baseball, the statistic applies also to players who, prior to a game, are included on a starting lineup card or are announced as ex ante substitutes, whether or not they play; however, in Major League Baseball, the application of this statistic does not extend to consecutive games played streaks. A starting pitcher, then, may be credited with a game played even if he is not credited with a game started or an inning pitched. An outfielder (OF) is a person playing in one of the three defensive positions in baseball farthest from the batter, who are identified as the left fielder (LF), the center fielder (CF), and the right fielder (RF). An outfielder's duty is to try to catch long fly balls before they hit the ground, or to quickly catch or retrieve and return to the infield any other balls entering the outfield. Outfielders normally play behind the six other members of the defense who play in or near the infield; unlike catchers and most infielders (excepting first basemen), who are virtually exclusively right-handed, outfielders can be either right- or left-handed. In the scoring system used to record defensive plays, the outfielders are assigned the numbers 7 (left field), 8 (center field) and 9 (right field).

The outfield positions are routinely regarded as being among the less physically demanding positions in baseball, largely due to the rarity of contact with opposing players and the longer reaction time possible after a ball is hit; long careers in the outfield have been common throughout major league history. Because game accounts and box scores often did not distinguish between the outfield positions, there has been some difficulty in determining precise defensive statistics prior to 1901; because of this, and because of the similarity in their roles, defensive statistics for the three positions are frequently combined. Ty Cobb is the all-time leader in major league games played as an outfielder with 2,934. Barry Bonds (2,874), Willie Mays (2,842), Rickey Henderson (2,826), Hank Aaron (2,760), Tris Speaker (2,698), and Lou Brock (2,507) are the only other outfielders to play in over 2,500 games in their careers; 55 players have appeared in more than 2,000 career games as outfielders.

Key

List
Stats updated through the 2022 season

Other Hall of Famers

Notes

References

External links

Major League Baseball statistics
Games played as an outfielder